The Growth of Biological Thought (992 pages, Belknap Press) is a book written by Ernst Mayr, first published in 1982.  It is subtitled Diversity, Evolution, and Inheritance, and is as much a book of philosophy and history as it is of biology.

It is a sweeping, academic study of the first 2,400 years of the science of biology.  It focuses largely on how the philosophical assumptions of biologists influenced and limited their understanding.  It includes many important general observations about the role of philosophy in scientific inquiry and the place of biology amongst the sciences.

References

External links
The Growth of Biological Thought - Google Books

Books about the history of science
Biology books
History of biology
Philosophy of biology
1982 non-fiction books
1982 in biology